George Bush (January 29, 1911October 27, 1967) was an American professional stock car racing driver.

Racing career
Bush competed in five NASCAR Grand National Series races in 1952, all for owner A. J. Lorenzo. He made his debut at Langhorne Speedway in the No. 16 Oldsmobile, starting ninth and finishing 34th. He recorded his first top ten at Occoneechee Speedway, where he finished tenth after starting 22nd. At the dirt track Lakewood Speedway, he switched to the No. 6, and finished a career-best seventh after qualifying 22nd.

Motorsport career results

NASCAR
(key) (Bold – Pole position awarded by qualifying time. Italics – Pole position earned by points standings or practice time. * – Most laps led.)

Grand National Series

References

External links
 

NASCAR drivers
1911 births
Racing drivers from New York (state)
People from Hamburg, New York
1967 deaths